Doctors is a British medical soap opera which began broadcasting on BBC One on 26 March 2000. Set in the fictional West Midlands town of Letherbridge, the soap follows the lives of the staff and patients of the Mill Health Centre, a fictional NHS doctor's surgery, as well as its two sister surgeries, the University of Letherbridge Campus Surgery and Sutton Vale Surgery. The following is a list of characters who currently appear in the programme, listed in order of first appearance. In the case that more than one actor has portrayed a character, the current actor portraying the character is listed last.

Doctors currently has a core cast of fourteen regular characters: business manager Bear Sylvester (Dex Lee); surgery partners and general practitioners Daniel Granger (Matthew Chambers) and Zara Carmichael (Elisabeth Dermot Walsh); general practitioners Jimmi Clay (Adrian Lewis Morgan), Emma Reid (Dido Miles), Al Haskey (Ian Midlane), Sid Vere (Ashley Rice) and Suni Bulsara (Rahul Arya); consultant midwife Ruhma Carter (Bharti Patel); nurse practitioner Luca McIntyre (Ross McLaren); receptionists Karen Hollins (Jan Pearson), Scarlett Kiernan (Kia Pegg) and Kirsty Millar (Kiruna Stamell) and police sergeant Rob Hollins (Chris Walker). As well as the regular characters, Doctors also features appearances from numerous recurring and guest characters. These currently include general practitioner and partner Nina Bulsara (Wendi Peters); nurse Tasha Verma (Maria Pike); relatives Joe Granger Carmichael (Oliver Falconer), Eve Haskey (Rachel Bell), Rich Millar (Richard Atwill) and Ollie Millar (Isaac Benn).

Present characters

Regular characters

Recurring and guest characters

Cast changes

Returning characters

Former characters

The original nine regular characters to be introduced in Doctors were Mac McGuire (Christopher Timothy), Steve Rawlings (Mark Frost), Helen Thompson (Corrinne Wicks), Rana Mistry (Akbar Kurtha), Caroline Powers (Jacqueline Leonard), Kate McGuire (Maggie Cronin), Anoushka Flynn (Carli Norris), Ruth Harding (Yvonne Brewster) and Joanna Helm (Sarah Manners), all of whom have since left. In the early 2000s, the Woodson family consisting of Ronnie (Seán Gleeson), George (Stirling Gallacher) and Bracken (Jessica Gallacher) were introduced, with the family appearing until the later half of the decade. The late 2000s also saw the departures of regulars Vivien March (Anita Carey), Archie Hallam (Matt Kennard) and Melody Bell (Elizabeth Bower). The early 2010s also featured the exits of several regular characters, including Lily Hassan (Seeta Indrani), Ruth Pearce (Selina Chilton), Simon Bond (David Sturzaker) and Freya Wilson (Lu Corfield). In 2013, producers wrote three characters out of the series, with Jack Hollins (Nicolas Woodman), Imogen Hollins (Charlie Clemmow) and Elaine Cassidy (Janet Dibley) exiting.

2015 saw Ian Kelsey leave his role as Howard Bellamy after three years due to the heavy filming schedule; his exit saw his character killed off. 2019 saw the exit of mainstay character Mrs Tembe (Lorna Laidlaw), who had gone from the receptionist to the practice manager of the Mill during her tenure. She was replaced by manager Becky Clarke (Ali Bastian), who left nine months into her tenure so that Bastian could focus on getting pregnant in real life. 2020 saw a brief guest appearance from former regular Julia Parsons (Diane Keen), who had originally appeared in Doctors from 2003 to 2012. Later that year, Ayesha Lee (Laura Rollins) left the soap. 2022 then saw the departure of another Doctors mainstay, Valerie Pitman (Sarah Moyle), with Princess Buchanan (Laura White) leaving in 2023 after getting Valerie fired.

Lists of characters by year of introduction

 2000
 2001–2002
 2003–2004
 2005–2006
 2007–2008
 2009
 2010
 2011
 2012
 2015
 2016
 2017
 2018
 2019
 2020
 2021
 2022
 2023

References

External links
 Character profiles on BBC Online
 Cast and characters of Doctors on IMDb